Ubungo I Thermal Power Station also known as the Ubungo Power Plant began commercial operations on 30 July 2008 with its Gas turbines.

History
The Ubungo Power plant has existed since 1995 using turbines that run on Oil. Tanzania power supply is heavily dependent on Hydro power and after the drought in 2003-2005, the country faced major energy deficiency.

Tanzania electric supply company decided to upgrade the turbines from Heavy Oil fuels to Natural gas. The company planned to obtain gas from the Songo Songo gas fields in southern Tanzania. Songas was given the contract to operate the powerplant and began commercial operations on 20 July 2004. Globeleq is the majority shareholder in Songas and operates powerplants for up to 25% of the national energy supply. Globeleq spent US$260 million in setting up the Songo Songo gas-power project and currently the operator of the power plant. A majority of that investment went into building a 225 km pipeline from Songo Songo island gas fields to Ubungo, Dar es Salaam.

Construction of the pipeline network was completed in May 2004. The first gas reached Dar es Salaam in July 2004, and the project started commercial operation in July 2004

Ubungo II

In July 2011, Siemens Energy secured an order from Jacobsen Elektro for three gas turbines to extend the Tanesco Ubungo power plant . The machines are also fueled from the Songo Songo gas field. The construction took 14 months and the new plant began operations in July 2012. This double the power output of the Ubungo Power plant project.

See also
Ubungo II Thermal Power Station
Tanzania Electric Supply Company Limited (TANESCO)
List of power stations in Tanzania
Economy of Tanzania

References

Power stations in Tanzania